Il re pastore is a 1751 Italian-language opera libretto written by Metastasio. It was first set by Giuseppe Bonno in 1751, but best known today in the version by Gluck (1756) and the Il re pastore of Mozart (1775).

Settings
Giuseppe Bonno (Vienna, 27 October 1751)
 (1752)
Giuseppe Sarti (Pesaro, 1752)
Francesco Antonio Baldassare Uttini (Drottningholm, 24 July 1755)
Johann Adolph Hasse (Hubertusburg, 7 October 1755)
Christoph Willibald Gluck (Vienna, 8 December 1756) – Il re pastore
Giovanni Battista Lampugnani (Milan, April 1758)
 (Bavaria, 1760)
Niccolò Piccinni (Florence, 27 August 1760)
Niccolò Jommelli (Ludwigsburg, 4 November 1764)
Pietro Alessandro Guglielmi (Venice, 1767)
Baldassare Galuppi (Parma, 1762)
Felice Giardini (London, 7 March 1765)
Antonio Tozzi (Braunschweig, 1766 or 1767)
 (1774)
Wolfgang Amadeus Mozart (Salzburg, 23 April 1775) – Il re pastore
Tommaso Giordani (London, 30 May 1768)
 (Dublin, carnival 1784)
 (1797)
Maria Teresa Agnesi (?)
Johann Friedrich Agricola (?)
 (?)
 (1762, Dresden)
Pietro Pompeo Sales (s. d.)

Libretti by Metastasio
1751 operas